Johanna Ylinen (born 19 July 1984 in Pori) is a Finnish judoka. At the 2008 Summer Olympics, she lost in the first round of the women's 63 kg.  At the 2012 Summer Olympics she competed in the Women's 63 kg, but was defeated in the second round.

References

External links
 
 

Finnish female judoka
Living people
Olympic judoka of Finland
Judoka at the 2008 Summer Olympics
Judoka at the 2012 Summer Olympics
1984 births
Sportspeople from Pori